Saint Syra of Troyes (or Syre; died ) was an Irish woman, sister of Saint Fiacre, who became a nun in France and died in Meaux but came to be venerated in Troyes. Her story has been conflated with that of a woman named Syria who died in Troyes in the 4th or 5th century. Her feast day is 8 June.

Monks of Ramsgate account

The monks of St Augustine's Abbey, Ramsgate wrote in their Book of Saints (1921),

Butler's account

The hagiographer Alban Butler (1710–1773) wrote in his Lives of the Fathers, Martyrs, and Other Principal Saints under June 8, 

Butler also wrote under August 30 in his life of St Fiaker, called by the French Fiacre,

O'Hanlon's account

John O'Hanlon (1821–1905) in his Lives of the Irish saints under June 8, notes that two distinct saints are honored on 8 June, Saints Syra and Syria, and their stories have been confused.
St. Syria was a matron at Troyes in the fourth of fifth century.
The Acts of St. Sabinian, Martyr, say that Syria of Troyes was a matron who had been  blind for many years and received her sight at the tomb of Sabinien.
She is venerated in Troyes on 8 June.
The Bollandists consider that St. Syra, sister of Fiacre, should properly by venerated on 23 October.
O'Hanlon continues,

Notes

Sources

 
 
 
 

Female saints of medieval Ireland
Medieval Irish saints on the Continent
7th-century deaths